SS City of Glasgow of 1850 was a single-screw passenger steamship of the Inman Line, which disappeared en route from Liverpool to Philadelphia in March 1854 with 480 passengers and crew. Based on ideas pioneered by Isambard Kingdom Brunel's  of 1845, City of Glasgow established that Atlantic steamships could be operated profitably without government subsidy. After a refit in 1852, she was also the first Atlantic steamship to carry steerage passengers, representing a significant improvement in the conditions experienced by immigrants. In March 1854 City of Glasgow vanished at sea with no known survivors.

Development and design
Built by Tod & Macgregor of Partick, Glasgow and launched on 28 February 1850, City of Glasgow at first carried 44 first class and 85 second class passengers along with 1,200 tons of cargo. Her iron hull considerably reduced repair costs incurred by the wooden-hulled steamships of the day, and the use of a propeller instead of paddle wheels allowed more space for passengers and cargo. City of Glasgow was especially economical because she was not built for speed; her best time across the Atlantic was 14 days, 4 hours, almost 4 days longer than Cunard Line's Asia, the record holder in 1850. While the City of Glasgows two-clinder lever-beam engine of  produced a moderate , her coal consumption was only 20 tons per day, compared with 76 tons for Asia.

Service history
She made five voyages on the Glasgow – New York City service on Tod & Macgregor's own account and sailed on her maiden voyage on 15 April 1850. City of Glasgow was the first steamship to travel from Glasgow to New York. William Inman, a business partner of the line of sailing packets, persuaded his other partners to expand their line by buying the advanced new steamship. On 5 October 1850, she was purchased by the newly formed Liverpool and Philadelphia Steam Ship Company (also known as the Inman Line) and moved to the Liverpool – Philadelphia route from 17 December 1850. In 1852, the company entered the immigrant trade and City of Glasgow was refitted to accommodate an additional 400 third class passengers in her holds.

Cabins were available in state rooms from fifteen to twenty one guineas for each berth. Steerage passengers were charged eight guineas. Dogs were £3.

Disappearance
City of Glasgow left Liverpool on 1 March 1854, with 480 people aboard. There were 111 cabin and saloon passengers and 293 in steerage. Her crew was 76: captain and 4 officers, 1 surgeon, 1 purser, 4 engineers, 6 firemen, 5 coal trimmers, 19 stewards and waiters, 1 stewardess, 1 quartermaster and 30 able seamen. She sailed under Captain K. Morrison. This was his first voyage in command, but he had served as her chief officer for many months before. He was reported to have considerable experience in navigating the Atlantic. She was due to return from Philadelphia on 25 March 1854.

No word was received from the ship after she left Liverpool. Her sister ship, the City of Manchester, met many icebergs and large fields of ice on her journey from Philadelphia on 8 March. Other ships reported that the ice was greater than had been witnessed for many years. Large icebergs and fields of ice were in the course that the steamers usually used. When news of her delay reached the ship's owners, they issued a report stating that they felt the ship had been detained in the ice. She was well supplied with water, coal and provisions. However, by the end of May 1854 she was accepted as lost. The ship and her cargo was insured for £50,000.

Her fate remains a mystery. Newspapers of the day reported various sightings of the ship, but these were often contradictory. For example, the captain of the Baldaur spotted a large steamer with a list to port on 21 April; however, he asserted it was "unlike that ill-fated vessel". The Mary Morris came upon the hull of large iron vessel that was apparently Clyde built and thought to be of the City of Glasgow. However the owners of the City of Glasgow ascertained that this was in fact the Shannon from Glasgow to Montreal.

It was reported that a portion of the bow of a ship, bearing the name City of Glasgow in gilded letters, washed ashore at Ballochgair near Campbeltown on 25 October 1854. However another ship called City of Glasgow at 416 tons had sailed from the Clyde under Muir towards Calcutta at the end of October. She may have been caught in late gales in the area but continued on her way. Lloyd's List reported a head-board been found with City of Glasgow on it in Kilbrannan Sound around the same time. This may be related to the Campbeltown find.

See also
 List of ocean liners
 List of shipwrecks
 List of United Kingdom disasters by death toll

References

External links
 Tod & Macgregor Shiplist: City of Glasgow
 The Ships List: Inman Line / Liverpool and Philadelphia Steamship Company / Liverpool, New York and Philadelphia Steamship Company
 TheShipsList: Ship Descriptions  C
 Scottish Built Ships - City of Glasgow
 Norway-Heritage: S/S City of Glasgow

1850 ships
Ships built in Glasgow
Maritime incidents in March 1854
Missing ships
Shipwrecks in the Atlantic Ocean
Steamships of the United States
Ships lost with all hands
1850 establishments in Scotland
Shipwrecks of Scotland
History of Argyll and Bute
Campbeltown
Steamships of the United Kingdom